Carlton Lamont "Scooter" McCray (born February 8, 1960) is an American former professional basketball player. He had a career in the National Basketball Association (NBA) from 1983 to 1987. He was selected large-school player of the year in 1978 by the New York State Sportswriters Association after his senior season at Mount Vernon High School. His younger brother Rodney, with whom he played alongside for the Cardinals at the University of Louisville, also played in the NBA.

After he retired, McCray became an assistant coach for the Louisville men's basketball team.

References

External links
College & NBA stats @ basketballreference.com
Jamfest For the Ages @ ESPN

1960 births
Living people
American expatriate basketball people in France
American men's basketball coaches
American men's basketball players
Basketball players from New York (state)
Charleston Gunners players
Cleveland Cavaliers players
Louisville Cardinals men's basketball coaches
Louisville Cardinals men's basketball players
McDonald's High School All-Americans
Parade High School All-Americans (boys' basketball)
Seattle SuperSonics draft picks
Seattle SuperSonics players
Small forwards
Sportspeople from Mount Vernon, New York
Mount Vernon High School (New York) alumni